João Paulo Mior (born 8 March 1991), known as João Paulo, is a Brazilian professional footballer who plays as a central midfielder for Seattle Sounders FC.

Career

João Paulo played youth futsal until the age of 14, when he switched to football on a full-time basis. He made his professional debut for Internacional in the 2010 Campeonato Gaúcho and he spent three seasons with the club. He was then loaned out to Atlético Goianiense in 2013, Goiás in 2014, and Santa Cruz in 2015. João Paulo transferred permanently to Santa Cruz in 2016 before being signed by Botafogo, where he played for three seasons and made 68 appearances, scoring five goals.

Seattle Sounders FC

On 31 January 2020, João Paulo was signed on loan by Seattle Sounders FC of Major League Soccer to a Designated Player contract. He made his debut in two 2020 CONCACAF Champions League fixtures, playing both legs in the Round of 16 against Honduran club C.D. Olimpia. During the first leg in San Pedro Sula, João Paulo scored the opening goal in a 2–2 draw; in the second leg, he scored Seattle's second goal in another 2–2 draw and converted his penalty in the shootout, but the Sounders were unable to advance. In his first MLS season with the club, which was shortened due to the COVID-19 pandemic, João Paulo made 19 appearances, including 17 starts, scoring two goals and recording five assists as a deep-lying playmaker.

His loan was made permanent by Seattle on 21 January 2021. João Paulo scored the club's first goal of the 2021 season, a volley from outside the penalty area against Minnesota United FC, which was voted MLS Goal of the Week. He played 31 matches for the Sounders during the regular season and scored three total goals, including another Goal of the Week winner in October against the Colorado Rapids. João Paulo was named to the five-candidate shortlist for the Landon Donovan MVP Award for his 11 assists and defensive performances, which helped the Sounders qualify for the playoffs despite a depleted roster.

João Paulo scored his first goal of the 2022 season against Minnesota—his third against the club—during a 2–1 away victory on 2 April. He played through Seattle's run to the 2022 CONCACAF Champions League Final, where the started in both legs as the Sounders won their first continental title. João Paulo left the final's second leg in the first half with an anterior cruciate ligament tear that left him unable to play for the rest of the year. His role in midfield was initially replaced with 16-year-old youth product Obed Vargas, who he had mentored, but Vargas suffered a back injury a month later. The lack of available defensive midfielders on the team was a factor in Seattle missing the MLS Cup Playoffs for the first time in their history.

Career statistics

Personal life

João Paulo has been a fan of American football since his childhood and supports the Pittsburgh Steelers. He is the nephew of former Gremio player Casemiro Mior.

Honours
Internacional
Recopa Sudamericana: 2011

Santa Cruz
Campeonato Pernambucano: 2015, 2016
Copa do Nordeste: 2016

Botafogo
Campeonato Carioca: 2018

Seattle Sounders FC
CONCACAF Champions League: 2022

Individual
MLS All-Star: 2021
MLS Best XI: 2021

References

External links

1991 births
Living people
Brazilian footballers
Association football midfielders
Campeonato Brasileiro Série A players
Campeonato Brasileiro Série B players
Sport Club Internacional players
Atlético Clube Goianiense players
Goiás Esporte Clube players
Santa Cruz Futebol Clube players
Botafogo de Futebol e Regatas players
Seattle Sounders FC players
Designated Players (MLS)
Major League Soccer players
Brazilian expatriate footballers
Brazilian expatriate sportspeople in the United States
Sportspeople from Rio Grande do Sul